The Battle of Tarraco was fought between the Vandals and the Western Roman Empire at Tarraco, Hispania Tarraconensis in 422. Campaigning in eastern Hispania, the Vandal king Gunderic had earlier defeated the Suebi. He met the Roman commander Flavius Castinus at Tarraco, modern day Tarragona. With the desertion of their Visigothic allies, the Romans were utterly defeated, making the Vandals the undisputed masters of Hispania. After the death of Gunderic, his brother Genseric led the Vandals to North Africa, where they founded a powerful kingdom.

Sources
 

422
Tarraco
Tarraco
Tarraco
Tarraco
Military history of Spain
Tarraco